The Bass Pro Shops Legends of Golf at Big Cedar is a golf tournament in Missouri on the PGA Tour Champions. Since 2014, it has been played at Big Cedar Lodge in Ridgedale on the par-3 Top of the Rock course, designed by Jack Nicklaus and the 18-hole Buffalo Ridge course, redesigned by Tom Fazio.  The tournament is sponsored by Bass Pro Shops, which owns the Big Cedar Lodge. It is often called "The tournament that launched the Champions Tour".  Starting in 2018, a second Par-3 course, Mountain Top, a 13-hole course designed by Gary Player, will be added to the tournament, which has the oddity of being a 67-hole tournament.

From 1978 until 2012, it was known as the Liberty Mutual Insurance Legends of Golf. Prior to Big Cedar Lodge, it was played in Savannah, Georgia, at The Club at Savannah Harbor. Liberty Mutual was the main sponsor of the tournament.

It currently consists of two separate events using four-ball and alternate shot formats with two-man teams: the 67-hole Champions Division (age 50–65) and the 58-hole Legends Division (age 65+) (on the final day of the tournament, held at Top of the Rock, Legends play the course once, while Champions play the course twice). Only the Champions Division event is an official money/official victory event.

For 2002 to 2013, it consisted of three separate events: the Legends Division is a 54-hole two-man team better-ball event for men over 50, the Raphael Division is a 36-hole two-man team better-ball event for men age 50–69, and the Demaret Division is a 36-hole two-man team better-ball event for men over 70. Only the Legends Division event was an official money/official victory event.

From 2014 until 2016, the tournament was held over 54 holes, one round at Buffalo Ridge, and four nine-hole rounds at Top of the Rock.  In 2017, because of weather that washed out play and made the full Buffalo Ridge course unplayable, all 36 (or 27) holes were played at Top of the Rock, the first time a PGA Tour event was held exclusively on a Par 3 course.

The tournament was founded in 1978 and consisted of a 72-hole two-man team better-ball event for men over 50. Its success provided impetus for the formation of the Senior PGA Tour in 1980. In 1987, a Legendary Division was added. This consisted of a 36-hole two-man team better-ball event for men over 60. These teams also competed in the Legends Division - Charles Coody & Dale Douglass won both divisions in 1998. In 1993, the 36-hole Demaret Division  (named after tournament co-founder Jimmy Demaret) was added for men over 70. For this year alone, all three divisions were competed at individual stroke play. In 2002 the Legends Division became an individual stroke play event and became an official money event on the Champions Tour. This format remained through 2007. The Legendary Division was renamed the Raphael Division (after tournament co-founder Fred Raphael who had died in 2001) and became the 36-hole two-man team better-ball event for men over 60.

The purse for the 2019 tournament was $1.8 million, with $171,000 going to each member of the winning team.

Tournament hosts
The tournament has been played in several different locations since its founding.

Team winners
Champions Tour event (Legends Division 2002–2013, Champions Division 2014– )
Unofficial money event  (Raphael Division 2002–2013, Demaret Division 2002–2013, Legends Division 2014–2017) 

Unofficial money event (1978–2001)

Individual winners

Multiple winners
The following teams have won multiple times through 2017:

The following individuals have won multiple times (as part of a team or individually) through 2017:

References

External links

Coverage on the PGA Tour Champions official site

PGA Tour Champions events
Golf in Texas
Golf in California
Golf in Florida
Golf in Georgia (U.S. state)
Golf in Missouri
Taney County, Missouri
Recurring sporting events established in 1978